Listed below in chronological order are the Minor League Baseball players chosen by Baseball America as recipients of the Baseball America Minor League Player of the Year Award. Since 1981, the award has been given to one minor league player judged by a Baseball America panel of experts as having had the most outstanding season.

List

See also

The Sporting News Minor League Player of the Year Award
USA Today Minor League Player of the Year Award
Topps Minor League Player of the Year Award
Minor League Baseball Yearly (MiLBY) Awards (formerly "This Year in Minor League Baseball Awards")
Minor League Baseball #Awards
Baseball awards#U.S. minor leagues
Baseball America awards

References

Minor league baseball trophies and awards
 
Awards by magazines
Awards established in 1981